Mesosa kirishimana is a species of beetle in the family Cerambycidae. It was described by Masaki Matsushita in 1943. It is known from Japan.

References

kirishimana
Beetles described in 1943